Muscoates is a hamlet and former civil parish, now in the parish of Nunnington, in the Ryedale district of North Yorkshire, England. It lies on the River Riccal,  to the south of the town of Kirkbymoorside.

Heritage
Muscoates is first mentioned in a 12th-century document. The name derives either from the Old English mūsa cotes, meaning "mouse-ridden cottages", or from an Old Norse personal name Músi. Muscoates was a township in the ancient parish of Kirkdale, and became a separate civil parish in 1866.

In 1974 it became part of the new district of Ryedale, and on 1 April 1986 the parish was abolished and merged with Nunnington.

Singular writer
Sir Herbert Read, the poet and art critic, was born at Muscoates in 1893, the son of a farmer. His fantasy novel The Green Child (1935) was described by the critic Geoffrey Wheatcroft in 1993 as "singular, odd, completely original".

References

Hamlets in North Yorkshire
Former civil parishes in North Yorkshire
Ryedale